Maybe I Do is a 2023 American romantic comedy film written and directed by Michael Jacobs, based on his own play Cheaters, and starring Diane Keaton, Richard Gere, Susan Sarandon, Emma Roberts, Luke Bracey, and William H. Macy.  It is Jacobs' feature directorial debut.

Cast
Luke Bracey as Allen
Emma Roberts as Michelle
Diane Keaton as Grace
Richard Gere as Howard
William H. Macy as Sam
Susan Sarandon as Monica

Production
Filming occurred in New Jersey in February and March of 2022.

Release
In November 2022, it was announced that Vertical Entertainment acquired North American rights to the film, which was released on January 27, 2023.

Reception 
 On Metacritic, the film has a weighted average score of 42 out of 100, based on 10 reviews, indicating "mixed or average reviews".

References

External links
 

Films shot in New Jersey
Vertical Entertainment films
2023 directorial debut films
2023 romantic comedy films
American romantic comedy films
2020s English-language films
Films scored by Lesley Barber